Diego Castillo (born January 18, 1994) is a Dominican professional baseball pitcher for the Seattle Mariners of Major League Baseball (MLB). He previously played in MLB for the Tampa Bay Rays.

Career

Minor leagues 
Castillo signed with the Tampa Bay Rays as an international free agent in March 2014. He made his professional debut that season with the Dominican Summer League Rays and spent the whole season there, going 3–3 with a 3.96 ERA in 25 innings. In 2015, he played for both the Hudson Valley Renegades and Bowling Green Hot Rods, compiling a combined 1–2 record and 3.03 ERA in 18 relief appearances. In 2016, he pitched with both Bowling Green and the Charlotte Stone Crabs, posting a combined 3–6 record and 2.98 ERA in 60.1 total innings pitched out of the bullpen. In 2017, Castillo played for the Montgomery Biscuits and Durham Bulls. He was named the Rays' minor league reliever of the year after posting a 2.76 earned run average (ERA) with 90 strikeouts and 15 saves in 71.2 innings pitched. The Rays added him to their 40-man roster after the season. He began the 2018 season with the Durham Bulls.

Tampa Bay Rays 
Castillo was promoted to the Tampa Bay Rays and made his debut on June 6, 2018. For the season, he split time between the bullpen and being one of the Rays' "opening" starters. Castillo threw  innings over 43 games, going 4–2 over 11 starts. He finished the year with a 3.18 ERA, 65 strikeouts and 18 walks.

In 2019, Castillo was used as both a closer and opener. On June 23, he was put on the 10-day injured list with shoulder inflation. He finished the season appearing in 65 games (6 starts). In  innings, he recorded 81 strikeouts, 8 saves, and an ERA of 3.41. In the postseason, Castillo threw 2 shutout innings in the American League Wild Card victory the Oakland Athletics. He threw  innings over three games (one start) in the American League Division Series, where the Rays lost to the Houston Astros in five games.

In 2020, Castillo was moved away from the opener role. On July 24, he went on paternity leave. Castillo collected 4 saves over 22 games, posting an ERA of 1.66 with 23 strikeouts and 11 walks. In the postseason, he was used in late innings consistently when the Rays had the lead. He pitched the final two innings of Game 5 of the ALDS against the New York Yankees, picking up the win after Mike Brosseau's 8th inning home run. In the American League Championship Series against the Astros, Castillo appeared in 7 games, going 1–0 with 2 saves and 2 holds. The first run he allowed was in Game 6.

Seattle Mariners 
On July 29, 2021, the Rays traded Castillo to the Seattle Mariners for J. T. Chargois and Austin Shenton.

References

External links

1994 births
Living people
Major League Baseball players from the Dominican Republic
Major League Baseball pitchers
Tampa Bay Rays players
Seattle Mariners players
Dominican Summer League Rays players
Hudson Valley Renegades players
Bowling Green Hot Rods players
Charlotte Stone Crabs players
Peoria Javelinas players
Montgomery Biscuits players
Durham Bulls players
Tigres del Licey players
Arizona Complex League Mariners players
Everett AquaSox players
People from María Trinidad Sánchez Province
2023 World Baseball Classic players